"Almost There" is a song written by Randy Newman for Walt Disney Pictures' 49th animated feature film The Princess and the Frog (2009).  It was originally recorded by actress and singer Anika Noni Rose in her film role as Tiana. The song was nominated for Best Original Song at the 82nd Academy Awards but lost to "The Weary Kind" from Crazy Heart. "Down in New Orleans", another song from the film, performed by Dr. John (with prologue & finale versions by Rose), was also nominated for the Oscar.

Synopsis 
Tiana and her mother Eudora, are at Tiana's restaurant. In the song, Tiana is singing that she is "Almost There" to successfully opening her dream restaurant. During the song sequence, the animation shifts to the same art deco style used in Tiana's picture of her dream restaurant that her father James gave her.

Other languages  
Besides the original English version, Disney Character Voices International released The Princess and the Frog (including the song) dubbed in 41 foreign-language versions of "Almost There".

Certifications

References

External links
  (on Disney's official channel)

Songs written by Randy Newman
Songs from The Princess and the Frog
2009 songs
2000s ballads
Walt Disney Records singles